Dreamcast Magazine may refer to:

 Dreamcast Magazine, British magazine published by Paragon Publishing
 Dreamcast Magazine or Dorimaga, names for the Japanese magazine later known as Gemaga
Official Dreamcast Magazine (UK), published by Dennis Publishing
Official Dreamcast Magazine (US), published by Imagine Media, Inc.